License Fee (1995–2001) was a chestnut Thoroughbred racehorse mare, by Black Tie Affair and out of the Deputy Minister mare Star Deputy. She was bred by Pedigree Farms in Ontario, Canada, and went on to win four graded stakes races. License Fee was initially trained by  Stanley Hough.

Her wins include:
 2000 Ballston Spa Handicap, won by one and a half lengths, ridden by Pat Day.
 2001 Gallorette Handicap, won by half a length, ridden by Pat Day.
 2001 Just a Game Stakes, won by a short head, ridden by Pat Day.
 2001 Sixty Sails Handicap, won by five lengths, ridden by Larry Melancon.

In June 2001, License Fee broke her right front leg during the Molly Pitcher Stakes, and was euthanized at the Monmouth Park Racetrack.

References

1995 racehorse births
2001 racehorse deaths
Racehorses bred in Canada
Thoroughbred family 4-m